Philip Paul Miller (22 January 1949 – 18 October 2017) was an English progressive rock/jazz guitarist and a central part of the Canterbury scene.

He was born in Barnet, Hertfordshire. Self-taught on guitar, Miller formed his first band, Delivery, at age 17, which backed blues musicians playing at Ronnie Scott's Jazz Club in London. 
In the 1970s he was a founding member of Matching Mole, Hatfield and the North and National Health. In later years he was a member of Short Wave (with Hugh Hopper, Pip Pyle, and Didier Malherbe), and In Cahoots with Richard Sinclair, Elton Dean, Peter Lemer, and Pip Pyle. In 2005 and 2006, Miller toured with a re-united Hatfield and the North. Miller also performed and recorded extensively in solo projects.

Miller died on 18 October 2017 in London from cancer.

Discography

Filmography
 2015: Romantic Warriors III: Canterbury Tales (DVD)

References

External links

 Official website
 Biography at Calyx, the Canterbury website
 Interview with Phil Miller at allaboutjazz.com
 Phil Miller Discography
 Canterbury Music Family Tree

1949 births
2017 deaths
Canterbury scene
English jazz guitarists
English male guitarists
English rock guitarists
Lead guitarists
Progressive rock guitarists
People from Chipping Barnet
Musicians from Hertfordshire
Hatfield and the North members
Delivery (band) members
In Cahoots members
Matching Mole members
National Health members
British male jazz musicians